Nicotinamide cofactor analogues (mNADs) are compounds that mimic the natural nicotinamide adenine dinucleotide cofactors in structure, to explore a mechanism or be used in biocatalysis or other applications.
These nicotinamide cofactor mimics generally retain the nicotinamide moiety with varying substituents.

Background 
Oxidoreducatses are enzymes that catalyze the transfer of a hydride ion between a substrate and a cofactor, in many cases, particularly those in metabolic reactions, that cofator is a form of nicotinamide adenine dinucleotide. Nicotinamide adenine dinucleotide phosphate (NADPH) is used in anabolic reactions while nicotinamide adenine dinucleotide (NAD+) is used in catabolic reactions.

Analogues 
Unlike the human body, typical chemical reactions are unable to regenerate the cofactor for further use. Synthetic cofactors have been researched to solve this problem. The analogues have been synthesized from similar compounds such as 1,4-dihydronicotinamide. These synthetic cofactors have since been used to better understand the mechanisms of reactions especially when it comes to stereospecificity, which may be enhanced by metal ions. Analogues serve as an alternative to traditional regeneration techniques.

References

Cofactors
Biochemistry